The Army of Mainz or Army of Mayence (Armée de Mayence) was a French Revolutionary Army set up on 9 December 1797 by splitting the Army of Germany into the Army of Mayence and the Army of the Rhine. Part of it split off on 4 February 1799 to form the Army of Observation, though part of that army then re-merged as the Army of Mayence on 28 March that year. The  remainder formed the Army of the Danube. In 1793, the French soldiers captured in the Siege of Mainz were paroled by the Prussians with the promise not to fight against the First Coalition for one year. As their parole conditions did not prohibit them from fighting French rebels in the interior, the troops were sent to fight in the War in the Vendée under the unofficial name "Army of Mayence". This body was absorbed into the Army of the West on 6 October 1793.

Army of Mayence 1793
Army of Mayence (or Mainz) was also the unofficial title of the 16,000-man garrison that surrendered on 23 July 1793 at the conclusion of the Siege of Mainz. They were paroled by the Prussian army on condition that they not fight against the First Coalition for one year. Army of the Rhine commander Alexandre de Beauharnais pointed out that the terms did not exclude them from fighting against French rebels inside France. Therefore, 14,000 troops from the garrison were sent to the War in the Vendée under Jean-Baptiste Annibal Aubert du Bayet where they proved to be better soldiers than the poorly-trained armies fighting there. The superiority of the Mainz corps was so evident that it provoked jealousy and in November 1793 the force was broken up.

Notes

Sources

1797 establishments in France
Mainz
Military units and formations established in 1797
History of Mainz